The Battle of Amanus Pass took place in 39 BC at Belen Pass in the Nur Mountains, after the Parthian defeat in the battle of the Cilician Gates. The Parthians, alarmed after their recent defeats by the forces of Publius Ventidius Bassus, began to concentrate their forces in northern Syria under the command of one of Parthia's best generals, Pharnapates.

The battle 
Pharnapates sent a strong Parthian detachment to protect the Syrian Gates, which protected a narrow pass over Mount Amanus. Ventidius sent forward one of his officers, Pompaedius Silo, with some cavalry, in order to capture this position. However, Pompaedius found himself compelled to engage with the forces of Pharnapates; the fighting was going in favour of the Parthians until Ventidius, who was concerned about his subordinate's situation,  brought his forces into the fight. This move turned the tide of the battle, which resulted in the Parthians being overpowered and defeated. Pharnapates himself was among the slain.

Aftermath 
When Pacorus I of Parthia heard news of this defeat he made the decision to retreat, and went about withdrawing his troops across the Euphrates. Ventidius did not hinder the Parthian withdrawal and instead proceeded to seize back Syria for the Roman Republic, which he succeeded in doing by early 38 BC.

See also 
 Roman Republic
 Publius Ventidius Bassus
 Parthian Empire

Sources 
 Dando-Collins, Stephen. "Mark Antony's Heroes". Published by John Wiley and Sons, 2008 , 978-0-470-22453-3

References 

1st century BC in the Roman Republic
1st century BC in Iran
Amanus Pass
Amanus
Amanus Pass
39 BC
History of Hatay Province
Amanus Pass